Matthew Robbins may refer to:

Matthew Robbins (footballer) (born 1977), Australian rules footballer
Matthew Robbins (screenwriter) (born 1945), American screenwriter, producer and director